Özdamar is a toponym and a Turkish surname. It may refer to:

 Özdamar, Kemah, village in the Kemah District of Erzincan Province in Turkey

People with the surname
 Emine Sevgi Özdamar (born 1946), writer, director, and actress of Turkish origin who resides in Germany
 Semra Özdamar (born 1956), Turkish actress
 Süleyman Özdamar (born 1993), Turkish footballer 

Turkish-language surnames